William Henry Ranger Cunningham (23 January 1900 – 29 November 1984) was a first-class cricketer in New Zealand from 1922 to 1931.

A right-arm opening bowler and lower-order batsman, Cunningham made his first-class debut for Canterbury in the 1922–23 season. He took 15 wickets at an average of 17.46 in the three-match Plunket Shield season to lead the national averages, with best figures of 5 for 72 (8 for 145 in the match) in the victory over Wellington.

In the first match of the 1924–25 season he took 6 for 33 against Auckland (8 for 51 in the match) to help Canterbury to victory by 342 runs. In the first innings of the next match, against Wellington, he came to the wicket at 184 for 8 and hit 33 not out to take the Canterbury total to 290, then took 5 for 83 in the first innings. Canterbury won by 57 runs. He was selected to play for New Zealand in the match against Victoria later in the season.

He toured Australia with New Zealand in 1925-26, where he was New Zealand's most successful bowler, with 13 wickets in the four state matches. He took 14 wickets in the Plunket Shield in 1926-27 and was selected for the tour of England in 1927. In England, however, he completely lost form and confidence, taking only five wickets in seven matches. He played a few matches over subsequent seasons but never regained his old form.

References

External links
Bill Cunningham at CricketArchive

1900 births
1984 deaths
New Zealand cricketers
Pre-1930 New Zealand representative cricketers
Canterbury cricketers
Cricketers from Christchurch